El Capricho is a park in Madrid. The name capricho means "folly" in Spanish. It was created by María Josefa Pimentel, Duchess of Osuna (1752-1834) on her estate at Alameda de Osuna, which was then outside the city of Madrid. It is landscaped in eighteenth-century style with formal and naturalistic features.
It is recognised as one of the most beautiful parks in the city.

The landscape design shows some English influence. Characteristically of continental gardens in the English style, there are a number of "eye-catchers" such as a hermit's house and a temple to Bacchus. Other features include a lake and a maze.

Structures

There are various buildings from the time of the Duchess, the largest being the ducal palacio.

The Duchess continued to make improvements to the gardens until the end of her life, one of the last features being an iron bridge, which was constructed in 1830.  This footbridge is claimed to be the first iron bridge in Spain.

There is a bunker from the Civil War period.  It is known as posición Jaca.

Conservation
The park has been designated a jardín histórico.

Access
The park is within the Madrid suburbs and is accessible by bus and metro (line 5). The park is normally open to the public at weekends.

In 2016 it was proposed to open the palace as a museum.

References

External links

Mazes in Spain
Parks in Madrid
Parks in the Community of Madrid
Barajas (Madrid)
Bunkers in Spain
Tourist attractions in Madrid